World Business Review is an American television infomercial series that has been criticized for pretending to be a bona fide independent news program. The show typically features executives of mostly up and coming companies talking about their products and services. Haig’s chats with executives seen as ‘30-minute commercial’, Current, Feb. 25, 2002. The infomercial series purchases airtime in North America. The infomercial is formatted as a panel discussion in combination with segments about specific companies and their solutions. Supporting material and commentary is "provided" by leading industry experts. The series has aired more than one thousand episodes and more than 4,000 interviews.

The company that produces World Business Review, MMP (USA), hires recognized names in politics, government and business—and not journalists or reporters—to serve as hosts and interviewers. Companies that are featured in the program often pay a fee to be involved, and generally are the only company featured in the program, which is why many classify the program as an infomercial. MMP (USA) also produces "21st Century Television with Donald Trump, Jr."

History 

World Business Review first aired Thursday evening September 5, 1996 on Philadelphia, PA's public television station WYBE.

Hosts and production 
In September 1996, World Business Review introduced its first host, Caspar Weinberger. Weinberger hosted World Business Review between 1996 and 2000, from episodes #301 to #711A.
Alexander M. Haig became the second host of the program. Haig hosted more than one thousand episodes during the taping period November 2000 to November 2006, from episodes #711B to at least #1818.
In September 2006, World Business Review introduced its third host, Norman Schwarzkopf.

References

External links
 Official site WBR w/ Norman Schwarzkopf

2000s American television series
1996 American television series debuts